Below is a list of all the people who have held the role of Commonwealth Ombudsman since establishment of the position by the Government of Australia in 1977.

References

 
Ombudsmen in Australia